Ellen Lee Geck Hoon (born 13 April 1957) is a Singaporean former politician. A member of the governing People's Action Party (PAP), she was the Member of Parliament (MP) for the Sembawang GRC for Woodlands from 27 April 2006 to 11 September 2015. She also holds a job at Singaporean law firm Ramdas and Wong. She replaced Chin Tet Yung as the Sembawang GRC MP on 27 April 2006 and was replaced with Amrin Amin on 11 September 2015.

Early life and education
Lee was born in Singapore on 13 April 1957. She attended the Toa Payoh-based CHIJ Primary in 1963 and later CHIJ Secondary. After completing her GCE Advanced Level examinations, Lee went on to study at the National University of Singapore, graduated in 1980 with a Bachelor of Laws degree.

Career
Lee began her professional law career at law firm Messrs Lim Kiap Khee & Co, starting out as a legal assistant in January 1981. Rising up the ranks, she was promoted to Sole Proprietor in October 1984. Lee left Messrs in September 2005. Since October 2005, she has been working at Ramdas & Wong as a law consultant, her area of expertise being, among others, family law, adoption and custody of children, bankruptcy and insolvency law, corporate and commercial law, conveyancing and property law, and immigration law. Lee enjoyed a decade's stint as chairperson of the Singapore Law Society's Family Law Practice Committee.

In 1997, the Pingat Bakti Masyarakat (Malay for Public Service Medal) was bestowed upon Lee. A member of the Singapore-based People's Action Party, Lee serves as an MP for the Sembawang GRC. She has held this position since May 2006. She has also been appointed as Deputy Chairman of the Singapore-Turkey parliamentary Friendship Group and the Government Parliamentary Committee for the Ministry of Defence and the Ministry of Foreign Affairs.

Personal life
Lee is married. Her religion is Taoism.

See also
 List of Singapore MPs
 List of current Singapore MPs

References

1957 births
Living people
Members of the Parliament of Singapore
People's Action Party politicians
Chaoshanese people
20th-century Singaporean lawyers
Singaporean people of Teochew descent
National University of Singapore alumni
Singaporean people of Chinese descent
Singaporean women lawyers
Singaporean women in politics
21st-century Singaporean lawyers